An election was held on November 6, 2012 to elect all 41 members to Delaware's House of Representatives. The election coincided with the elections for other offices, including U.S. President, U.S. Senate, U.S. House of Representatives, state governor and state senate. The primary election was held on September 11, 2012.

Democrats consolidated their control of the House by gaining one seat, winning 27 seats compared to 14 seats for the Republicans.

Results

Statewide

District
Results of the 2012 Delaware House of Representatives election by district:

References

House of Representatives
Delaware House of Representatives
2012